A Romantic Adventure (Italian: Una romantica avventura) is a 1940 Italian historical drama film directed by Mario Camerini and starring Assia Noris, Gino Cervi and Leonardo Cortese. It is inspired by the 1883 short story The Romantic Adventures Of A Milkmaid by Thomas Hardy. Produced when the two countries were at war, the setting was shifted from the English countryside of the late nineteenth century to Piedmont in the 1830s.

It was shot at the Cinecittà Studios in Rome and on location around Lake Orta. The film's sets were designed by the art director Gastone Medin. It was screened at the 1940 Venice Film Festival.

Cast
 Assia Noris as Angioletta/Anna/Annetta
 Gino Cervi as Luigi
 Leonardo Cortese as Il conte
 Olga Solbelli as La vedova Cavara
 Ernesto Almirante as Berni, il socio di Luigi
 Calisto Bertramo as Silvestro
 Massimo Girotti as Luciano 
 Alfredo Martinelli as Il violonista dell'orchestra paesana
 Armando Migliari as Il padre di Annetta
 Giacomo Almirante as 	Il dottore 
 Bianca Beltrami as Un'amica di Annetta 
 Edoardo Borelli as 	Il farmacista 
 Adelmo Cocco as Don Antonio, il prete 
 Dhia Cristiani as 	Tonina, la cameriere 
 Adele Mosso as 	La nonna di Annetta 
 Amalia Pellegrini as La vecchia domestica 
 Armando Rossini as Pinotto 
 Edda Soligo as Un'amica di Annetta
 Lina Termini as La cantante 
 Olga von Kollar as Un'amica di Annetta

References

Bibliography 
 Aprà, Adriano. The Fabulous Thirties: Italian cinema 1929-1944. Electa International, 1979.

External links 
 

1940 films
1940s Italian-language films
1940s historical drama films
Italian historical drama films
Films directed by Mario Camerini
Italian black-and-white films
Films shot at Cinecittà Studios
Films set in Piedmont
Films set in the 1830s
Films set in the 1850s
Films based on works by Thomas Hardy
1940s Italian films